In the 2011 FIFA Women's World Cup qualification process, one spot was allocated to the winner of a two-legged play-off between the winner of the UEFA repechage play-offs and the winner of the third-place qualification match in the 2010 CONCACAF Women's Gold Cup.

Qualified teams
From UEFA, Italy qualified by defeating Ukraine and Switzerland in repechage play-offs. Italy had been defeated by France in the direct qualification stage in UEFA.

From CONCACAF, the United States qualified by defeating Costa Rica in the third-place play-off. The U.S. had been defeated by Mexico in the semi-finals, their first ever loss in the Women's Gold Cup and  their first loss ever to Mexico.

Summary
The draw for the order of legs was held at the FIFA headquarters in Zürich, Switzerland on 17 March 2010. The matches were played on 20 and 27 November 2010.

|}

Matches

United States won 2–0 on aggregate and qualified for the 2011 FIFA Women's World Cup.

Goalscorers

References and notes

Qualification
FIFA Women's World Cup qualification (UEFA–CONCACAF play-off)
FIFA Women's World Cup qualification (UEFA–CONCACAF play-off)
FIFA Women's World Cup qualification (UEFA–CONCACAF play-off)
2010
2010
play
Play-off Concacaf
2011
2011
FIFA Women's World Cup qualification (UEFA–CONCACAF play-off)
FIFA Women's World Cup qualification (UEFA–CONCACAF play-off)